Muttom road Eraniel is a place near Eraniel in Kanyakumari district  in the state of Tamil Nadu, India.

Geography
It has an average elevation of 10 meters (32 feet). It is near to Thingalnagar.

Muttom road Eraniel is a small settlement which sprawls over an area of around 3 km2. It is bounded in the north by Thalakkulam and in the east by Villukuri. Muttom road Eraniel is around 72 km from Thiruvananthapuram and 7 km from Colachel Port. Kanyakumari, the southernmost tip of India, is nearly 32 km from the town. Nearby tourist destinations include Padmanabhapuram Palace (was the capital of Travancore). In 1745, the capital was shifted from Padmanabhapuram to Thiruvananthapuram.

The nearest airport is Trivandrum International Airport, 72 km away. Eraniel Railway Station serves the town. Muttom road Eraniel can be approached by road from Nagercoil, Muttom, Thuckalay and Colachel.

Demographics
 India census, Muttom road Eraniel had a population of 3230. Males constitute 50% of the population and females 50%.Muttom road Eraniel has an average literacy rate of 82%, higher than the national average of 59.5%: male literacy is 84%, and female literacy is 80%. In Eraniel, 9% of the population is under 6 years of age.

Education
Kidzee Preschool, Muttom Road eraniel
Nursing College, Neyyoor
Uma Matric Hr. Sec School, Alwarcoil
Victory Matric H sec School, Mylode
Mother Teresa H sec School, Mylode
Government Higher Secondary School Eraniel, Thingalnagar
Government High School for Girls, Eraniel
L.M.S Girls High sec School
St. Fr. Xavier H S School Mankuzhy
St. Fr. Xavier H. Sec. School. Pattari Vilai.

Sports teams
Never Back Losers cricket team
Wanted Guys cricket team
Mission Starts cricket team

Nearest hospital
Dr.S. Chithambara Kuttalam Pillai, Eraniel (Child specialist)
Siva Hospital, Near GHSS Eraniel
B.N.Clinic [Dr.Kollappan]
CSI Mission Hospital, Neyyoor

Nearest banks
State Bank of India, Thingalnagar
Indian Overseas Bank, Eraniel
HDFC Bank, Thukalay
Syndicate Bank, Thingalnagar
Tamil Nadu Mercantile Bank, Thingalnagar
Kaniyakumari District Co-operative Bank, Thingalnagar
Federal Bank, Eraniel

References

Kanyakumari district